Shuko Aoyama and Erika Sema were the defending champions, but Aoyama decided not to defend her title. Erika teamed up with her sister Yurika Sema as the fourth seeds, but they lost in the first round.
Jarmila Gajdošová and Storm Sanders won the title, defeating Eri Hozumi and Miki Miyamura in the final, 6–4, 6–4.

Seeds

Draw

References 
 Draw

McDonald's Burnie International - Women's Doubles
2014 Women's Doubles
McDonald's Burnie International - Women's Doubles